Howard Nicholson  (1912–2014) was a British pulmonologist and pioneer in multidisciplinary care-planning and the treatment of tuberculosis with antibiotics.

Biography
Howard Nicholson began the study medicine at University College Hospital (UCH) in 1929, graduating MB BS and qualifying MRCS, LRCP in 1935. At UCH he held training posts, including registrar in radiology. He graduated with the higher MD degree from UCH in 1938.

In WWII Nicholson joined the RAMC. He departed from England in 1941 to serve in Palestine and Egypt as part of a chest surgical team headed by Andrew Logan, who used a multidisciplinary approach to teamwork. Nicholson was promoted to lieutenant colonel before demobilization, when he was appointed registrar and then chief assistant at the Brompton Hospital.

Nicholson was elected FRCP in 1949 and was appointed Goulstonian Lecturer in 1950. In the 1950s he was one of the pioneers of antibacterial therapy for tuberculosis. With Clifford Hoyle and other colleagues he published two of the first papers on long-term combination anti-bacterial therapy for tuberculosis to reduce the relapse rate following conventional short courses.

Nicholson married in 1941. His wife died in 2001. They had no children.

Selected publications

with Clifford Hoyle and J. Dawson:

References

1912 births
2014 deaths
20th-century English medical doctors
British pulmonologists
English centenarians
Fellows of the Royal College of Physicians
Men centenarians
Royal Army Medical Corps officers